Bastani is a surname, commonly found in the Iranian language. People with this surname include:

 Aaron Bastani (born c. 1983), British journalist and writer
 Hassan Bastani (born 1962), Iranian researcher and designer
 Masoud Bastani (born 1978), Iranian reformist journalist
 Mohammad Ebrahim Bastani Parizi (1924–2014), Iranian historian

See also 

 Bastani, an Iranian-style ice cream

Iranian-language surnames